Andai (Meakambut, Pundungum, Wangkai) is an Arafundi language of Papua New Guinea.

Locations
Kassell, et al. (2018) list Namata, Kupina, Kaiyam, Andambit, and Awarem as the villages where Nanubae is spoken. In the Andai area, the Mongolo (or Meakambut, after one of their former villages) people, a group of about 50–60 people, live east of the Arafundi River; Kassell, et al. (2018) believe this may be a separate ethnolinguistic group.

According to Ethnologue, it is spoken in Andambit, Awarem, Imboin, Kaiyam, Kupini, and Namata mountain villages in Imboin ward, Karawari Rural LLG, East Sepik Province.

References

Arafundi languages
Languages of East Sepik Province